Amor y Sexo is the twenty-eighth  studio album by La Mafia released on June 3, 2014. This album was released after a six-year absence. La Mafia held a release party to celebrate the album and their return to the studio. They also announced a tour under the same name. The album reached the top 10 on the Billboard Top Latin Albums chart.

Track listing

References

2014 albums
La Mafia albums
Spanish-language albums